The River Ingrebourne  is a tributary of the River Thames 27 miles (43.3 km) in length. It is considered a strategic waterway in London, forming part of the Blue Ribbon Network. It flows through the London Borough of Havering roughly from north to south, joining the Thames at Rainham.

Etymology
The name is recorded in 1062 as Ingceburne and its suffix is a form of the Old English 'burna', meaning bourne, a type of stream. The meaning of the prefix is unclear, although it could refer to a person.

Description
It rises near Brentwood, Essex, whence it flows in a southwesterly direction under the M25 motorway through the London Borough of Havering in north east London. The river passes under the motorway near Junction 28, where the first of its tributaries, the 2.7 miles (4.3 km) long Weald Brook joins, followed shortly by Carters Brook and Paynes Brook. After skirting south of the built-up area of Harold Hill the route is partly non-urban: a large area of flood-plain follows before the Ingrebourne threads between the suburbs of Upminster and Hornchurch.

The river from here is surrounded by public open space: with Gaynes Parkway, the Ingrebourne Valley Greenway and Hornchurch Country Park taking up the area until reaching Rainham. Here the river divides, the main channel becoming Rainham Creek, where it flows into the Thames between Hornchurch Marshes (to the west) and Rainham Marshes (to the east) at Old Man's Head. The second channel becomes the Wennington Sewers complex.

Significance

The Ingrebourne Marshes are a Site of Special Scientific Interest because of the diversity of its wildlife and extensive areas of wetland reeds. The river forms one of the strategic waterways identified in the Blue Ribbon Network policy in the London Plan. The Ingrebourne Valley is a Local Nature Reserve.

See also
 Tributaries of the River Thames
 List of rivers in England

References

Rivers of London
Geography of the London Borough of Havering
Parks and open spaces in the London Borough of Havering
1Ingrebourne